Antipterna hemimelas is a species of moth in the family Oecophoridae, first described by Alfred Jefferis Turner in 1940 as Ocystola  hemimelas. The species epithet, hemimelas, derives from the Greek, έμιμελας ("half black").  The male holotype for Ocystola  hemimelas was collected in Perth, Western Australia.

Further reading

References

Oecophorinae
Taxa described in 1940
Taxa named by Alfred Jefferis Turner